The Revonah Manor Historic District is a  predominantly residential historic district in Stamford, Connecticut that was listed on the National Register of Historic Places in 1986.  The district encompasses what was one of Stamford's first planned residential developments, developed by Herman Henneberg and his son-in-law Henry Jevne, with many houses designed by Lawrence Barnard.  The result was a remarkable concentration of fairly uniformly-designed Colonial Revival and Tudor Revival houses in a three-block area.  Most of the houses are on Urban, Chester, and Fifth Streets, between Revonah Avenue and Bedford Street.

See also

National Register of Historic Places listings in Stamford, Connecticut

References

Colonial Revival architecture in Connecticut
Historic districts in Fairfield County, Connecticut
Geography of Stamford, Connecticut
National Register of Historic Places in Fairfield County, Connecticut
Historic districts on the National Register of Historic Places in Connecticut